Westmoore High School is an American four-year public high school located in south Oklahoma City, Oklahoma. The school was founded in 1988 and serves the ninth through the twelfth grades as part of the Moore Public School District. Westmoore was the second high school in the district after Moore High School. Southmoore High School, which opened in the 2008–2009 academic year, is the third.

On May 3, 1999, tornadoes severely damaged the campus, and its auditorium, and a nearby elementary school. The remainder of the school year for the approximately 2,000 students was finished at Oklahoma City Community College.

Academically, Westmoore offers a program in which 11th or 12th grade students may apply to take morning or afternoon courses as offered at Moore Norman Technology Center. Seventeen Advanced Placement courses are offered by Westmoore in several topics including AP Music Theory,  AP Studio Art, and AP Psychology.

Notable alumni
 Billy Bajema, professional football player San Francisco 49ers (2005-2008), St. Louis Rams (2009-2011), and Baltimore Ravens (2012-2013).
Kellie Coffey, singer
Krystal Keith, country music singer
Kyle Tyler, professional baseball player Los Angeles Angels (2021), San Diego Padres (2022)
Jamey Wright, professional baseball player Colorado Rockies (1996-1999),(2004-2005), Milwaukee Brewers (2000-2002), St. Louis Cardinals (2002), Kansas City Royals (2003),(2009), San Francisco Giants (2006), Texas Rangers (baseball) (2007-2008), Cleveland Indians (2010), Seattle Mariners (2010-2011), Los Angeles Dodgers (2012),(2014) and Tampa Bay Rays (2013).
 Camille Herron, professional ultramarathon runner and World Record holder

AP Courses offered
 AP Biology
 AP Calculus, AB and BC
 AP Chemistry
 AP Computer Science Principles
 AP Computer Science A
 AP Language and Composition
 AP Literature and Composition
 AP Environmental Science
 AP European History
 AP United States Government
 AP United States History
 AP Physics, 1 and C
 AP French IV
 AP Spanish IV
 AP Music Theory
 AP Psychology
 AP Statistics
 AP Studio Art IV
 AP Human Geography
 AP World History

References

External links
School Website

Public high schools in Oklahoma
Educational institutions established in 1988
Schools in Oklahoma City
1988 establishments in Oklahoma